Jim Moodie born 15 February 1966 in Dumfries is a retired British Superbike, Supersport and Isle of Man TT racer who retired in 2003 from the TT races after being caught up in the accident that claimed the life of David Jefferies. He also raced successfully in British superbikes, finishing second on two occasions and winning the supersport championship twice, the first time with his own private bike.

Moodie's first TT win was in 1993 when he was successful in winning both the 600 and 400 Supersport classes, his final win was in 2002 when he won the Junior TT giving him a total of eight TT wins. In the 1998 production TT, Moodie riding a Honda, posted the first ever lap of over 120mph by a rider on a standard road going production motorcycle. In 1999, riding the by then ageing 750cc Honda RC45 against the newer more powerful 1000cc Yamahas ridden by David Jefferies and Ian Duffus, Moodie broke the outright TT lap record, then held by Carl Fogarty, from a standing start, a feat not achieved since the late sixties by world champion John Surtees. However, tyre issues forced Moodie out of the race while in the lead. Moodie was the last rider to break the outright record on a 750cc machine. 

Apart from his racing prowess Moodie was well known for his abilities to develop and set up race machines. One being the famous twin shock Duckhams rotary Norton that won the British Superbike championship in 1994 and also the Valmoto Racing 2003 Triumph 600 Supersport machine that incredibly, against most pundits thoughts, won the Isle of Man TT that very year.

Moodie was one of a dying breed of Motorcycle racers who consistently raced and won at the highest level on both the short circuits and major road races.

References

1966 births
Isle of Man TT riders
Living people
Scottish motorcycle racers